This is a List of Imperial German cavalry regiments before and during World War I.  In peacetime, the Imperial German Army included 110 regiments of cavalry.  Some of these regiments had a history stretching back to the 17th century but others were only formed as late as October 1913.

On mobilisation, they were joined by 33 reserve cavalry regiments, 2 landwehr cavalry regiments and 1 ersatz cavalry regiment was also formed.  Also on mobilisation, there were 38 landwehr squadrons (assigned to the mixed landwehr brigades) and 19 ersatz detachments (assigned to the mixed ersatz brigades).

Pre-war regiments

Regiments formed on mobilisation 
33 Reserve Cavalry Regiments, 2 Landwehr Cavalry Regiments and 1 Ersatz Cavalry Regiment were formed on mobilisation in August 1914 and assigned to field formations.  Each of these had a strength of 3 squadrons.

See also 

Bavarian Army
German cavalry in World War I
List of Imperial German artillery regiments
List of Imperial German infantry regiments

References

Bibliography 
 
 
 

 
 
German
Imperial German cavalry regiments